General elections were held in Western Samoa on 27 April 1951. Although the 1948 elections had been fought by two political parties, the 1951 elections saw all candidates run as independents.

Electoral system
The Legislative Assembly included twelve Samoans elected by the Fono of Faipule and five Europeans members directly elected by people with European status, which included people of mixed European and Samoan descent. Prior to the elections, Chinese residents had been granted European status, with 164 registering to vote.

Results

European members

Samoan members

References

Elections in Samoa
Western Samoa
General
Western Samoa